Capital punishment is a legal penalty in Belarus. At least four executions were carried out in the country in 2018.

Also known as an Exceptional Measure of Punishment, it has been a part of the country's legal system since gaining independence from the Soviet Union on August 25, 1991. The current national constitution prescribes this punishment for "grave crimes." Later laws have clarified the specific crimes for which capital punishment can be used. The death penalty can be imposed for crimes that occur against the state or against individuals. A few non-violent crimes can also be punishable by death. As of 2021, Belarus is the only country in Europe that continues to carry out the death penalty. Executions are carried out by a single shot to the back of the head.

Following a referendum on the issue, the Belarusian government took steps to change the way capital punishment is imposed and carried out. International organisations, such as the United Nations, have criticised the methods Belarus uses when carrying out capital punishment. The use of capital punishment is one factor keeping the country out of the Council of Europe.

Legislation
Article 24 of the Constitution of Belarus states that:

As per the Criminal Code of the Republic of Belarus, capital punishment can be imposed for the following acts:

Launching or conducting aggressive war (Article 122, Part 2)
Murder of a representative of a foreign state or international organisation to provoke international complications or war (Article 124, Part 2)
International terrorism (Article 126)
Genocide (Article 127)
Crimes against humanity (Article 128)
Application of weapons of mass destruction under international treaties of the Republic of Belarus (Article 134)
Violation of the war laws and usage (Article 135, Part 3)
Murder committed under aggravating circumstances (Article 139, Part 2)
Terrorism (Article 289, Part 3)
Treason connected with murder (Article 356, Part 2)
Conspiracy to seize state power (Article 357, Part 3)
Terrorist acts (Article 359)
Sabotage (Article 360, Part 2)
Murder of a police officer (Article 362)

Most of the death penalty convictions were for murder committed under aggravating circumstances. Court proceedings involving capital cases must involve a "collegial consideration," consisting of one judge and two People's assessors. The People's assessors are chosen from the general population, similar to the jury system.

Over the years, the number of offenses eligible for the death penalty and the type of convicts eligible for it have been reduced. In 1993, four economic crimes that would have resulted in death sentences during the Soviet era were removed from the list of capital offenses by a vote of parliament and were replaced by prison terms without parole. Although the total number of categories of crime qualifying for capital punishment declined during this time, Presidential Decree No. 21, issued on October 21, 1997, added "terrorism" to the list of capital offenses. When the Criminal Code was updated in 1999, the number of capital offenses was further reduced. This reduction was assisted by the introduction of life imprisonment in December 1997.

Since March 1, 1994, women are ineligible for capital punishment and persons under the age of 18 at the time of the crime or over 65 at the time of sentencing have been exempt from capital punishment since January 2001. Those who are mentally ill may have their death sentence commuted. Under Article 84 of the Constitution, the president "may grant pardons to convicted citizens". From June 30, 2003, to June 30, 2005, President Alexander Lukashenko granted two pardons to death row inmates and denied one such request.

In 2000, the Parliamentary Assembly of the Council of Europe condemned "in the strongest possible terms the executions in Belarus and deplores the fact that Belarus is currently the only country in Europe where the death penalty is enforced and, moreover, is regularly and widely enforced".

Belarus is the only European country to have carried out executions in the 21st century. European Council members suggested in 2001 that Belarus abolish capital punishment before it can apply for membership in the Council. Belarus (as the Byelorussian SSR) signed the International Covenant on Civil and Political Rights in 1973. This convention, however, does not abolish the death penalty, but it imposes certain conditions on its implementation and use.

In 7 December 2022, Belarusian lawmakers approved a bill which punishes high treason among officials and military personnel with the death penalty. The bill also includes prosecution for "spreading false information discrediting the Armed Forces of Belarus".

On 9 March 2023, President Alexander Lukashenko signed a bill into law which allows the use of the death penalty on officials and military servicemen convicted of high treason.

Method
Before being executed, all prisoners on death row are transferred to Minsk Detention Center No. 1 (СИЗО, or SIZO No. 1), in the country's capital Minsk. The method used to carry out the sentence is execution by shooting. The executioner is a member of the "committee for the execution of sentences," which also chooses the area where the execution will take place. According to the book The Death Squad by Oleg Alkayev (Олег Алкаев), on the day of execution the convict is transported to a secret location where he is told by officials that all appeals have been rejected. The convict is then blindfolded and taken to a nearby room, where two staffers force him to kneel in front of a bullet backstop. The executioner then shoots the convict in the back of his head with a PB-9 pistol equipped with a suppressor. According to Alkayev, "The whole procedure, starting with the announcement about denied appeals and ending with the gunshot, lasts no longer than two minutes".

After the sentence is carried out, a prison doctor and other officials certify that the execution has been performed and a death certificate is prepared. The remains of the condemned are buried secretly, and the family is notified that the execution has taken place. Colonel Oleg Alkayev, a former director of SIZO No. 1, claimed that about 130 executions took place at the prison between 12/1996 and 05/2001, when he left Belarus to live in exile in Berlin, Germany.

The United Nations Human Rights Committee issued the following opinion of the execution process in Belarus after the mother of subsequently executed prisoner Anton Bondarenko petitioned the Committee to spare her son's life: "[the process has] the effect of intimidating or punishing families by intentionally leaving them in a state of uncertainty and mental distress…[and that the] authorities' initial failure to notify the author of the scheduled date for the execution of her son, and their subsequent persistent failure to notify her of the location of her son's grave amounts to inhuman treatment of the author, in violation of article 7 of the Covenant [prohibiting torture or cruel, inhuman or degrading treatment or punishment]."

Number of executions 
The following is a rough estimate of the number of executions carried out since 1985, as per Belarusian Ministry of Internal Affairs (MVD):
1985 – 21 – Byelorussian SSR
1986 – 10
1987 – 12
1988 – 12
1989 –  5
1990 – 20
1991 – 14
1992 – 24
1993 – 20
1994 – 24
1995 – 46
1997 – 46
1998 – 47
1999 – 13
2000 – 4
2001 – 7
2007 – at least one
2008 – at least 4
2009 – 0
2010 – 2
2011 – 2
2012 – 1
2013 – 3
2014 – 3
2015 – 0
2016 – 4
2017 – 2
2018 – 4
2019 – 2
2020 – 0
2021 – 1
2022 – 0

The exact number of people executed in Belarus is not known, since the last documents released by the Belarusian Government were in 2006. Moreover, other sources, notably BelaPAN, have published somewhat different data.  BelaPAN, the abbreviation for "Беларускае прыватнае агентства навiн" (Belarusian Private News Agency), records 278 executions from 1992 to 2010 with two additional men under death sentence in September 2010. Due to some of the practices of the MVD, such as the non-disclosure of the graves of the executed, this is a violation of the Organization for Security and Cooperation in Europe protocol to make information about capital punishment open to the public.

Public opinion
In a 1996 referendum, one of the seven questions asked was about abolishing the death penalty. According to the results of this referendum, 80.44% of Belarusians were against abolition. However, at the time of the referendum, the longest available prison sentence was 15 years. Since then the sentence of life imprisonment was introduced (in December 1997). There have not been more recent surveys to determine whether the change in maximum prison sentence affected public sentiment about the death penalty.

More recently a parliamentary special working group announced plans to conduct a public opinion poll, but the Information and Analytical Center with the Administration of the President took over this undertaking. The Center has released its report, "Public Opinion about the Activity of the Organs of Internal Affairs of the Republic of Belarus," which included the questions about death penalty and the attitudes of Belarusian citizens about abolition of capital punishment. That poll showed only 4.5% of the respondents were against capital punishment in all cases, 79.5% considered capital punishment appropriate punishment for at least some grave crimes and about 10% had difficulty answering these questions or offered no opinion.

There have been several steps taken toward reducing the imposition of the death penalty in Belarus. The Law of the Republic of Belarus of December 31, 1997, added Article 22, which allows for "imprisonment for the term of one's life (life imprisonment) as an alternative to capital punishment."  Capital punishment has also since been restricted to men between the age of 18 and 65.

Court cases 
On March 11, 2004, the Constitutional Court of the Republic of Belarus came to the conclusion that two articles of the Criminal Code were incompatible with the Constitution of Belarus. The Court stated that either the President or the National Assembly could make the decision to suspend or completely abolish the death penalty. Subsequently, in October 2005, the Parliament adopted an amendment to the Criminal Code declaring that the continued use of the death penalty was on a temporary basis only.

References

External links 
 Interview with Oleg Alkaev, former head of Belarus's death row
 The website of «The Human Rights Defenders against the Death Penalty in Belarus» campaign
 History of the death penalty in Belarus
 Petition against the Death Penalty in Belarus

 
Belarus
Murder in Belarus
Law of Belarus
Human rights abuses in Belarus